Lance Watson (born October 6, 1983 in Nederland, Texas) is an American soccer player.

Career

College and amateur
Watson played college soccer at the University of New Mexico from 2002 to 2005. He finished his career with 22 assists, good enough for second all-time in school history, and helped lead the Lobos to the 2005 NCAA Championship game. He also played in the USL Premier Development League, for Indiana Invaders in 2004 and Chicago Fire Premier in 2005.

Professional
Watson was drafted in the second round, 16th overall, by the Kansas City Wizards in 2006 MLS SuperDraft. After four seasons with the Wizards, Watson was released on March 1, 2010. On March 30, 2010, the Austin Aztex announced the signing of Watson to a two-year contract.

Watson signed a two-year deal with USSF Division 2 club Austin Aztex in March 2010.

References

External links
 Austin Aztex player profile

1983 births
Living people
American soccer players
Association football defenders
Association football midfielders
Austin Aztex FC players
Chicago Fire U-23 players
Indiana Invaders players
Major League Soccer players
New Mexico Lobos men's soccer players
People from Nederland, Texas
Soccer players from Texas
Sporting Kansas City draft picks
Sporting Kansas City players
USL League Two players
USSF Division 2 Professional League players